Gresham may refer to:

Places

Australia
Gresham County, New South Wales

United Kingdom
Gresham, Norfolk

United States
Gresham, Chicago, Illinois
Gresham, Missouri
Gresham, Nebraska 
Gresham, Oregon
Gresham, Texas
Gresham, Wisconsin

Buildings
 Gresham Hotel, Dublin, Ireland
 Gresham Palace, Budapest, Hungary
 Gresham (Edgewater, Maryland)

Educational establishments
Gresham College, London, England
Gresham Middle School (disambiguation)
Gresham's School, Norfolk, England

Other 
 Gresham (surname)
 Gresham's law, in economics
 USCGC Gresham, a series of boats
 Gresham Technologies plc

See also 
 Grisham (disambiguation)
 Grissom (disambiguation)